The Mouse and His Child is a novel by Russell Hoban first published in 1967. It has been described as "a classic of children's literature and is the book for which Hoban is best known." It was adapted into an animated film in 1977. A new edition with new illustrations by David Small was released in 2001.

The mouse and child of the title are a pair of toy mice, joined by the hands and operated by clockwork. The story tells of their beginning in a toy store, their purchase and eventual discarding, their pursuit by a malicious rat, and their quest to become self-winding.

Like E. B. White's Charlotte's Web, the book contrasts with much of children's literature by its occasional advanced vocabulary and willingness to include adult themes.

References

External links
Ellis, Sarah. "A Toy's Life and a Boy's Life" (book review). The New York Times, November 18, 2001.

1967 American novels
American children's novels
Fictional mice and rats
Sentient toys in fiction
American novels adapted into films
Books by Russell Hoban
Harper & Row books
1967 children's books